Andicola is a monotypic moth genus of the family Noctuidae. Its only species, Andicola huallatani, is found in Bolivia. Both the genus and species were first described by Staudinger in 1894.

References

Cuculliinae
Noctuoidea genera
Monotypic moth genera